Here Come the Girls is a 1918 American short comedy film featuring Harold Lloyd about activities in a corset shop. Prints of the film survive in the film archive of the Museum of Modern Art.

Cast
 Harold Lloyd 
 Snub Pollard 
 Bebe Daniels 
 William Blaisdell
 Sammy Brooks
 Lige Conley (credited as Lige Cromley)
 Genevieve Cunningham
 Billy Fay (credited as William Fay)
 William Gillespie
 Bud Jamison
 Gus Leonard
 James Parrott
 Dorothea Wolbert

Reception
Like many American films of the time, Here Come the Girls was subject to cuts by city and state film censorship boards. For example, the Chicago Board of Censors cut all but one scene of the young women behind the curtain showing bare shoulders and legs and four scenes of the women's skirts being pulled up by ribbon exposing legs.

See also
 Harold Lloyd filmography

References

External links

1918 films
1918 short films
1918 comedy films
Silent American comedy films
American silent short films
American black-and-white films
Films with screenplays by H. M. Walker
American comedy short films
1910s American films